The chondrocranium (or cartilaginous neurocranium) is the primitive cartilaginous skeletal structure of the fetal skull that grows to envelop the rapidly growing embryonic brain.

The chondrocranium in different species can vary greatly, but in general it is made up of five components, the sphenoids, the mesethmoid, the occipitals, the optic capsules and the nasal capsules.

In humans, the chondrocranium begins forming at 28 days from mesenchymal condensations and is fully formed between week 7 and 9 of fetal development. While the majority of the chondrocranium is succeeded by the bony skull, some components do persist into adulthood. In cartilaginous fishes (e.g. sharks and rays) and agnathans (e.g. lampreys and hagfish), the chondrocranium persists throughout life. Embryologically, the chondrocranium represents the basal cranial structure, and lays the base for the formation of the endocranium.

Divisions
The portion of the chondrocranium that is associated with the notochord is termed the chordal chondrocranium and is formed from mesodermally-derived mesenchyme.  The more rostral portion of the chondrocranium that lie anterior to the notochord constitutes the prechordal chondrocranium, and is derived primarily from neural crest-derived mesenchyme.

See also
 Dermal bone

References

Vertebrate developmental biology
Skull